Frederick Richardson (1862-1937) was an American illustrator.

Frederick Richardson may also refer to:

 Frederick Richardson (American cricketer) (1918–1983), American cricketer
 Frederick Richardson (Australian cricketer) (1878–1955), Australian cricketer